Hoitovirhe (English: Malpractice), released on 10 December 2004 by Spinefarm Records, is the first full-length album by the Finnish industrial metal band Turmion Kätilöt.

Track listing

Singles

Teurastaja 
 "Teurastaja"
 "4 Käskyä"

Verta ja lihaa 
 "Verta ja lihaa"
 "Volvot ulvoo kuun savuun"

References 

2004 albums
Turmion Kätilöt albums